Eulasiodora is a genus of beetles in the family Buprestidae, containing the following species:

 Eulasiodora singularis Obenberger, 1931
 Eulasiodora umtalina (Peringuey, 1908)

References

Buprestidae genera